John Howard (1863 – 5 September1911) was Conservative MP for Faversham. He was returned unopposed in 1900, but lost to the Liberals in 1906.

He was a major in the Royal East Kent Yeomanry.

He married in 1896 the Hon. Emily Violet, daughter of Carnegie Robert John Jervis, 3rd Viscount St Vincent and widow of William Hargrave Pawson of Shawdon; they had one son.

Sources
Craig, F.W.S. British Parliamentary Election Results 1885-1918
Whitaker's Almanack, 1901 to 1907 editions

Conservative Party (UK) MPs for English constituencies
Politics of Kent
1863 births
1911 deaths
Royal East Kent Yeomanry officers
English justices of the peace
Deputy Lieutenants